Grażyna Józefa Rabsztyn (born September 20, 1952 in Wrocław) is a retired Polish hurdler. She represented her country at the Summer Olympics on three occasions (1972–1980) and was a finalist each time (twice placing fifth).

Rabsztyn set three world records in 100 m hurdles. On June 10, 1978 she became the first runner under 12.5 seconds with a new record of 12.48 seconds. She had the same time a year later, on June 18, 1979, and finally, on June 13, 1980 she had her best time ever, 12.36 seconds. Her world record was matched and later beaten by Yordanka Donkova. Rabsztyn's then world record time gives her the eleventh place in the all-time list of 100 m hurdlers. Her personal best remains the Polish record for the event

Rabsztyn never won an outdoor Olympic, World or European medal. She did, however, win several medals at indoor competitions. She was a two-time 60 metres hurdles champion at the European Athletics Indoor Championships and was silver medallist in the event on four more occasions. Rabsztyn won three consecutive titles in the 100 m hurdles at the Summer Universiade from 1973 to 1977 and two straight titles at the IAAF World Cup (1977 and 1979).

Competition record

1Representing Europe
2Did not finish in the final

References

External links
 

1952 births
Living people
Sportspeople from Wrocław
Polish female hurdlers
World record setters in athletics (track and field)
Olympic athletes of Poland
Athletes (track and field) at the 1972 Summer Olympics
Athletes (track and field) at the 1976 Summer Olympics
Athletes (track and field) at the 1980 Summer Olympics
Universiade medalists in athletics (track and field)
Universiade gold medalists for Poland
Universiade silver medalists for Poland
Medalists at the 1973 Summer Universiade
Medalists at the 1975 Summer Universiade
Medalists at the 1977 Summer Universiade
20th-century Polish women